A. D. Bright (August 10, 1838 – September 11, 1898) was a justice of the Tennessee Supreme Court in 1894.

Born in Hinds County, Mississippi, Bright was a captain in the Confederate States Army, and afterwards became "a prominent lawyer and leading democrat", serving as a member of the Commission of Referees from 1883 to 1885.

On March 16, 1894, he was appointed to the Tennessee Supreme Court to fill vacancy caused by death of Benjamin J. Lea. Bright opted not to run for election to the seat later that year, and served until September 1, 1894.

Bright died at Brownsville, Tennessee at the age of 60.

References

1838 births
1898 deaths
People from Hinds County, Mississippi
Confederate States Army officers
Justices of the Tennessee Supreme Court